17.5 mm film was a film gauge for as many of eight types of motion picture film stock, generally created by splitting unperforated 35 mm film.

History 
17.5 mm film was first documented in 1898 with the creation of the Birtac camera, and subsequently went through several different iterations up until the end of World War II, when Kodak's 16 mm film and 8 mm film largely took its place in terms of popularity.  In addition to original pioneering experiments, 17.5 mm film was used during World War II to use existing 35 mm stock more economically. Afterward, this format continued to be used primarily in developing countries such as India, or for projects where usage of regular 35 mm film would have been too expensive.

Partial list

Birtac 
The British-American photographer and inventor Birt Acres split 35 mm film in half for his Birtac camera-projector in 1898. The film used had a single row of perforations running down the left side of the image, with two perforations per image. Historically, this is considered to be the first piece of motion picture equipment that utilized 17.5 film.

Biokam 
Alfred Wrench and Alfred Darling created second 17.5 mm format film in 1899 in London. The only differences between their and Acres' film was that their film had central perforations, and it could be utilized as a medium for still pictures as well. The Biokam camera, projector, and printer (all in one machine) was produced by the Warwick Trading Company.

References

External links 
 Tracing 17.5mm practices in Germany in 1902–1908
 A Brief History of Amateur Film Gauges and Related Equipment

Film formats